Ankumbura is a village in Sri Lanka. Ankumbura may also refer to the following villages in Sri Lanka
Ankumbura Pallegama
Ankumbura Udagama